Lissette Diaz (born 1983) is an American actress, model and beauty pageant contestant who represented the United States in Miss World 2005.  She was the third Hispanic contestant to be crowned. Lissette also graduated from Barbizon Modeling and Acting School in San Francisco.

References 

1983 births
Miss World 2005 delegates
Living people
American beauty pageant winners